Dávid Buc (born 22 January 1987) is a Slovak professional ice hockey forward who is currently playing for HK Dukla Michalovce of the Slovak Extraliga.

Career
He made his professional debut with hometown club, HK Poprad in the Slovak Extraliga (Slovak). He formerly played with Bratislava in the Extraliga during the 2010–11 season.

He returned to HC Slovan Bratislava after 6 years, securing an initial KHL try-out contract on August 16, 2018.

Career statistics

Regular season and playoffs

International

References

External links

1987 births
Living people
HC '05 Banská Bystrica players
Bratislava Capitals players
HK Dukla Michalovce players
HK Dukla Trenčín players
HC Karlovy Vary players
MHK Kežmarok players
HC Košice players
HC Olomouc players
HK Poprad players
Rouyn-Noranda Huskies players
HC Slovan Bratislava players
Slovak ice hockey forwards
MsHK Žilina players
Sportspeople from Poprad
Slovak expatriate ice hockey players in Canada
Slovak expatriate ice hockey players in the Czech Republic